Hardscrabble was a small unincorporated community in Green Township, Madison County, Indiana. As of 1989 it had four houses, and its population was never greater than 16.

Geography
Landmarks include a white farmhouse and the newly built Trinity Life Center.

References

Unincorporated communities in Madison County, Indiana
Unincorporated communities in Indiana
Indianapolis metropolitan area